Greenfield High School, also known as Riley Elementary School, was a historic school building located at Greenfield, Hancock County, Indiana.  It was designed by the architectural firm of Wing & Mahurin and built in 1895–1896.  It was a -story, "U"-shaped, Romanesque Revival style stone-faced building with a -story central tower. It was destroyed by fire on April 30, 1985.

It was listed on the National Register of Historic Places in 1982 and delisted in 1986.

References

Former National Register of Historic Places in Indiana
School buildings on the National Register of Historic Places in Indiana
Romanesque Revival architecture in Indiana
School buildings completed in 1896
Schools in Hancock County, Indiana
National Register of Historic Places in Hancock County, Indiana